Ena Lake may refer to:

Canada
Ena Lake, Ontario
Ena Lake (Saskatchewan)